Joyce Olivia Redman (7 December 1915 – 9 May 2012) was an Anglo-Irish actress. She received two Oscar nominations for Best Supporting Actress for her performances in the 1963 film Tom Jones and the 1965 film Othello.

Early life
Joyce Redman was born in Northumberland and grew up in County Mayo, Ireland. She was born into an Anglo-Irish family, and educated by a private governess in Ireland, along with her three sisters. She trained in acting at the Royal Academy of Dramatic Art in London, graduating in 1936.

Career
Her acting roles were primarily in the theatre and in television films. Her most successful appearances on the stage were during the 1940s, in Shadow and Substance, Claudia, and Lady Precious Stream, and she appeared at the Comédie-Française as well as The Old Vic. She made a big success in New York in 1949 playing Anne Boleyn opposite Rex Harrison as Henry VIII in Maxwell Anderson's play Anne of the Thousand Days, and, in 1955, she joined Stratford-upon-Avon's Shakespeare Memorial Theatre to play Helena in All's Well That Ends Well and Mistress Ford in The Merry Wives of Windsor. In 1974, Redman played Sophie Dupin, the mother of George Sand, in the BBC serial Notorious Woman.

Redman also appeared in a few films. She was nominated for an Academy Award for Best Supporting Actress for her work in Tom Jones (1963); and again for Othello (1965), in which she appeared as Emilia to the Desdemona of Maggie Smith and the Othello of Laurence Olivier. Her work on Othello also earned her a Golden Globe nomination.

Personal life
Redman married Charles Wynne Roberts in New York City in 1949; he predeceased her. She is survived by their three children and five grandchildren. Her son Crispin Redman is an actor.

Redman died in Pembury, Kent, England, on 9 May 2012 at age 96 from pneumonia.

Filmography

Reviews / biographical pieces

References

External links
 
 
 

1915 births
2012 deaths
People educated at Bedford High School, Bedfordshire
Alumni of RADA
20th-century Anglo-Irish people
Irish film actresses
Irish stage actresses
Irish television actresses
Deaths from pneumonia in England
Irish emigrants to the United Kingdom
Actors from County Mayo
20th-century Irish actresses
21st-century Irish actresses